A partial solar eclipse will occur on Friday, January 16, 2037. A solar eclipse occurs when the Moon passes between Earth and the Sun, thereby totally or partly obscuring the image of the Sun for a viewer on Earth. A partial solar eclipse occurs in the polar regions of the Earth when the center of the Moon's shadow misses the Earth.

Images 
Animated path

Related eclipses

Solar eclipses of 2036–2039

Metonic cycle

References

External links 
 NASA graphics

2037 in science
2037 1 16
2037 1 16